White Rock Township is located in Ogle County, Illinois,  United States. As of the 2010 census, its population was 738 and it contained 298 housing units.

Geography
The unincorporated community of White Rock is located in the township.

Demographics

References

External links 
City-data.com
Ogle County Official Site
Illinois State Archives

Townships in Ogle County, Illinois
Populated places established in 1849
Townships in Illinois
1849 establishments in Illinois